Swashbuckle are an American heavy metal band based in Plainsboro, New Jersey, and were signed to Nuclear Blast Records. Formed in 2005, the band is known for its pirate image and humorous stage performances.

History

Swashbuckle was formed in early 2005 when bassist Patrick Henry and guitarist Justin Greczyn met each other at a Red Lobster and realized their mutual love for thrash metal and pirates. They decided to form a band and release a demo in early 2005, then after they had found drummer Mike Soganic and guitarist Joe Potash, they released the Yo Ho Demo later that year. The band members then took up the stage names of Admiral Nobeard (Henry), Commodore Redrum (Greczyn), Captain Crashride (Soganic), and Rowin' Joe Po (Potash).

Their debut album Crewed by the Damned was released independently in 2006, and shortly after Rowin' Joe Po (Joe Potash) quit the group to join New Jersey thrash metal band Eliminator. The band began a tour of North America in August 2007. They completed the North American Paganfest tour alongside Korpiklaani, Primordial, Moonsorrow, and Blackguard in April and May 2009. They completed the European Paganfest tour alongside Korpiklaani, Die Apokalyptischen Reiter, Unleashed, Alestorm, and Ex Deo in September 2009. They appeared on the Monsters of Death tour in November and December 2009 alongside Vader, Decrepit Birth, Warbringer, The Amenta, and Augury. They appeared on Tour From Afar alongside Ensiferum also in November 2009. They toured alongside Heaven Shall Burn, Caliban, Dark Tranquility, and Dealock in Europe as part of the Darkness over Xmas tour in December 2009. They toured alongside Korpiklaani, Týr and White Wizzard in January 2010 and supported Hypocrisy on a North American tour during May 2010. Swashbuckle also went On Tour as a supporting act for Soilwork's "Panic Over North America Tour", along with Death Angel, Augury, and Mutiny Within.

Swashbuckle performed at the 20th Anniversary of the Wacken Open Air Festival in the summer of 2009 and have also appeared at the Legacy Open Air Festival, The Summer Nights Open Air Festival, and the Metal Days Open Air Festival.

In 2010, Swashbuckle parted ways with drummer Captain Crashride (Mike Soganic) who went on to join Non-Stop. Bootsmann Collins (Paul Christiansen) was announced as his replacement. Soon after this they began working on their new album entitled Crime Always Pays, set for a September release.

Swashbuckle tune their instruments to D standard tuning.

"Crime Always Pays" was released by Nuclear Blast on September 10, 2010. The band also took part in the "70,000 Tons Of METAL" Festival along with other well known acts such as Amon Amarth, Exodus, Fear Factory, Sabaton, Sodom, Nevermore, Testament, Obituary, Death Angel and Ensiferum. As of 2011, Bootsmann Collins has been replaced by Legendary Pirate King Eric "The" Brown.

Alestorm in their album Back Through Time reference the band in the song 'Swashbuckled'.

In February 2014 Swashbuckle, once again, was invited to set sail, as performers on the "70,000 Tons Of METAL" cruise.

In August 2014 Swashbuckle released their anticipated, vinyl recording disc release, "We Hate the Sea EP" on Get This Right records.

Band members

Current members
 Admiral Nobeard (Patrick Henry) - lead vocals, bass (2005–present)
 Commodore Redrum (Justin Greczyn) - guitars, backing vocals, keyboards (2005–present)
 Legendary Pirate King Eric "The" Brown (Eric W. Brown) - drums (2011–present)

Former members
 Captain Crashride (Mike Soganic) - drums (2005-2010)
 Rowin' Joe Po (Joe Potash) - guitars (2005-2006)
 Cabinboy Arsewhipe (Ryan Hemphill)- keyboards (2005)
 Bootsmann Collins (Paul Christiansen) - drums (2010-2011)

Timeline

Discography

Crewed by the Damned (2006)
Back to the Noose (2009)
Crime Always Pays (2010)
We Hate the Sea (EP) (2014)

References

2005 establishments in New Jersey
American musical trios
American thrash metal musical groups
American death metal musical groups
Heavy metal musical groups from New Jersey
Musical groups established in 2005
Nuclear Blast artists